Sonia Martínez Díaz is a Spanish mechanical engineer whose research applies control theory to the coordinated motion of robot swarms and mobile wireless sensor networks. She is a professor in the Department of Mechanical and Aerospace Engineering at the University of California, San Diego.

Education and career
Martínez was the first in her family to study at a university, the University of the Basque Country.

After working as a visiting assistant professor at the Polytechnic University of Catalonia, she came to the US on a Fulbright Fellowship for postdoctoral research with Francesco Bullo at the University of Illinois at Urbana–Champaign and University of California, Santa Barbara. She took her faculty position at the University of California, San Diego in 2005, and became a full professor there in 2014.

Recognition
In 2018, Martínez was named an IEEE Fellow, affiliated with the IEEE Control Systems Society and IEEE Robotics and Automation Society, "for contributions to geometric mechanics and control".

Selected publications

Articles
. Winner of the CDC Best Student-Paper Award.

. Listed as a "classic paper" by Google Scholar.
. Winner of the 2008 IEEE Control Systems Magazine Outstanding Paper Award.

Books

References

External links
Home page

Year of birth missing (living people)
Living people
Spanish engineers
Spanish women engineers
University of the Basque Country alumni
University of Zaragoza alumni
Charles III University of Madrid alumni
University of California, San Diego faculty
Fellow Members of the IEEE